Port William may refer to several places:
 Port William, Falkland Islands, an inlet in the Falkland Islands
 Port William, New Zealand, an inlet on Stewart Island
 Port William, Dumfries and Galloway, a fishing village in Scotland
 Port William, Ohio, a village in the U.S. state of Ohio
 Port William, Kentucky, a fictional location in the writing of Wendell Berry

See also
Port Williams (disambiguation)
Puerto Williams